The Battle of Garigliano was fought in 915 between Christian forces and the Saracens. Pope John X personally led the Christian forces into battle. The aim was to destroy the Arab fortress on the Garigliano River, which had threatened central Italy and the outskirts of Rome for nearly 30 years.

Background
After a series of ravaging attacks against the main sites of the Lazio in the second half of the 9th century, the Aghlabids established a colony next to the ancient city of Minturnae, near the Garigliano River. Here they even formed alliances with the nearby Christian princes (notably the hypati of Gaeta), taking advantage of the division between them.

In 909, the Aghlabid Dynasty had been overthrown and replaced by the Fatimids, who assumed control over their territories in North Africa and southern Italy.

Pope John X, however, managed to reunite these princes in an alliance in order to oust the Fatimids from their dangerous strongpoint. The Christian armies united the pope with several south Italian princes of Lombard or Greek extraction, including Guaimar II of Salerno, John I of Gaeta and his son Docibilis, Gregory IV of Naples and his son John, and Landulf I of Benevento and Capua. The King of Italy, Berengar I, sent a support force from Spoleto and the Marche, led by Alberic I, duke of Spoleto and Camerino. The Byzantine Empire participated by sending a strong contingent from Calabria and Apulia under the strategos of Bari, Nicholas Picingli.

Battle
The first action took place in northern Lazio, where small bands of ravagers were surprised and destroyed. The Christians scored two more significant victories at Campo Baccano, on the Via Cassia, and in the area of Tivoli and Vicovaro. After these defeats, the Muslims occupying Narni and other strongholds moved back to the main Fatimid stronghold on the Garigliano: this was a fortified settlement (kairuan) whose site, however, has not yet been identified with certainty. The siege lasted for three months, from June to August.

After being pushed out of the fortified camp, the Fatimids retired to the nearby hills. Here they resisted many attacks led by Alberic and Landulf. However, deprived of food and noticing their situation was becoming desperate, in August they attempted a sally to reach the coast and escape to the Emirate of Sicily. According to the chronicles, all were captured and executed.

Aftermath
Berengar was rewarded with Papal support and eventually the imperial title, while Alberic's prestige after the victorious battle granted him a preeminent role in the future history of Rome. John I of Gaeta was able to expand his duchy to the Garigliano and received the title of patricius from Byzantium, leading his family to proclaim themselves "dukes".

Following the victory, the Byzantines, as the most important force during the battle, became the dominant power in southern Italy.

References

Garigliano
Battles of the Middle Ages
Garigliano
910s conflicts
Islam in Italy
915
10th century in Italy
Garigliano
Garigliano
Battles in Lazio
Duchy of Amalfi
Principality of Salerno
Duchy of Gaeta